Colus minor is a species of sea snail, a marine gastropod mollusk in the family Buccinidae, the true whelks.

Description
The length of the shell attains 57 mm

Distribution
This marine species occurs off Hokkaido and Sakhalin in the Sea of Okhotsk.

References

 Okutani T. (2017). Family Buccinidae. Pp. 917-939, in: T. Okutani (ed.), Marine Mollusks in Japan, ed. 2. 2 vols. Tokai University Press. 1375 pp.

External links
 Dall, W. H. (1925). Illustrations of unfigured types of shells in the collections of the United States National Museum. Proceedings of the United States National Museum. 66, art. 17, no. 2554: 1-41, pls. 1-36.

Buccinidae
Gastropods described in 1925